Yaza Dewi (also known as Na Yaza Dewi (နာရာဇဒေဝီ)) was a principal queen of King Binnya Ran I of Hanthawaddy. She was most likely the king's chief queen consort since the 1485/86 Shwedagon Pagada inscriptions by King Dhammazedi list King Binnya Ran I and Queen Na Yaza Dewi as the royal donors in 798 ME (1436/37).

Notes

References

Bibliography
 
 
 

Chief queens consort of Hanthawaddy